Terrance James Houle (born 1975) is an Internationally recognized Canadian interdisciplinary artist and member of the Kainai Nation  and ancestry from the Sandy Bay Reservation, Manitoba. His Mother is Maxine WeaselFat from the Kainai Nation and Father Donald Vernon Houle from Sandy Bay Reservation in Manitoba, they are both 3rd generation Residential School attendees & reside on the Blood reservation in Southern Alberta, Canada. His work ranges from subversive to humorous absurdity to solemn and poetic artistic expressions. His work often relates to the physical body as it investigates issues of history, colonization, Aboriginal identity and representation in popular culture, as well as conceptual ideas based on memory, home, and reserve communities. Currently, He has co-directed a Short Animation Otanimm/Onnimm with his daughter Neko which is currently touring Film festivals, In Los Angeles, NYC, Toronto, New Zealand, Vancouver, Oxford & many more. Recently their short film won the prestigious Golden Sheaf Indigenous Award at Yorkton Film Festival and is Neko's First Award in Film at 17 years old.

 Houle works in whatever media strikes him, and has produced work in photography, painting, installation, mass marketing, performance, music, video, and film. Houle is based in Calgary, Alberta.

Early life
Houle was born in 1975 in Calgary, Alberta, Canada. He holds a BFA degree in Fibre & textiles from the Alberta College of Art and Design 2003. His father was an army sergeant in the Canadian Armed Forces, and the family moved around a lot. This constant relocation reinforced the importance of his Aboriginal identity and cultural backgrounds to Houle, which formed the basis of his art practice. He has been involved with Aboriginal communities all his life, traveling across North America to participate in Powwow dancing along with his native ceremonies. He has one Daughter Neko Wong-Houle born 2003 who is a registered member of the Kainai Nation, Saulteaux and of Chinese & Romanian Decent

Solo exhibitions 

2009–2010 Givn'r - York University, Toronto, Ontario; Plug-in Gallery, Winnipeg, Manitoba; Thunder Bay Art Gallery, Thunder Bay, Ontario. This touring exhibition was a survey of Houle's work from 2003-2009.
2010 Friend or Foe, Or Gallery, Vancouver. 
2009 Things May Appear Larger - Red Shift Gallery, Saskatoon, Saskatchewan 
2008 85.11.16 - Skew Gallery, Calgary, Alberta
2005 Remember In Grade…- The New Gallery +15 Window, Calgary, Alberta
2003 Kipi-Dapi-Pook-Aki, Taking Back Control – Glenbow Museum, Calgary, Alberta
2003 A Little Western - +15 Window Project, Truck Gallery, Calgary, Alberta.

Group exhibitions 
2010 SKIN, National Museum of the American Indian, New York City
2009 Friend or Foe, SAW Gallery, Ottawa, and Or Gallery, Vancouver
2009 REZIDENTS, Open Sky Gallery, Fort Simpson and Neutral Ground, Regina (2010) and Neutral Ground, Regina, Saatchewan
2009 The World Upside Down, Art Gallery of Victoria, BC
2009 Face the 2 Nation, Art Gallery of Alberta, Edmonton, Alberta
2009 Photo LA 2008, SKEW Gallery, Los Angeles
2009 Photo Miami 2007, SKEW Gallery, Miami, Florida
2007 Alberta Biennial of Contemporary Art: Living Utopia and Disaster, Art Gallery of Alberta, Edmonton, Alberta 
2006 Wagon Burner This! Princess Moonrider That!, A Space Gallery, Toronto, ON 
2006 The Bodies That Were Not Ours, Linden St. Kilda Centre for the Contemporary Arts, Melbourne, Australia

GHOST DAYS 
Since 2014, Houle has been working on an ongoing collaborative project titled GHOST DAYS. GHOST DAYS evokes colonial and non-colonial histories that exist in the light of night as in the darkness of the day, and awakens a collaboration with artists, audience, and spirit. So far it has involved a residency at Banff Centre for the Arts, performances, a blog, music tracks on Soundcloud and Bandcamp, and a feature length film hosted by Vimeo and represented by Vtape. The film was shot at IXL Brick Factory Medalta Clay Historical, Medicine Hat, Alberta.

Collections
His work Your Dreams Are Killing My Culture (2009) was purchased for the permanent collection of the National Gallery of Canada in 2011.
His work is also included in the permanent collections of the Glenbow Museum, the Art Gallery of Greater Victoria and the Alberta Foundation for the Arts.

Awards 
Houle and his daughter Neko won the prestigious 2021 Yorkton Film Festival Golden Shear Indigenous Award for their short animation "Otanimm/Onnimm" produced in 2019/20. He received the 2004 Enbridge Emerging Artist Award presented at the Mayors Luncheon for the Arts, City of Calgary, Alberta. He was awarded Best Experimental Film at the 2004 imagineNATIVE Film and Media Festival in Toronto, Ontario. He was also an invited participant in the Banff Centre for the Arts program Communion and Other Conversations Artist in Residency Program at Banff, Alberta, in 2003.

References 

Terrance Houle, et al. Terrance Houle: Givn'r . Winnepeg: Plug in Editions, 2012.
Adrian A. Stimson and David Garneau. The Life and Times of Buffalo Boy. Calgary: Truck, Contemporary Art in Calgary, 2014.
Catherine Crowston, et al. Face the Nation : KC Adams, Lori Blondeau, Dana Claxton, Terrance Houle, Maria Hupfield, Kent Monkman, Adrian Stimson, Jeff Thomas. Edmonton: Art Gallery of Alberta, 2008.

External links 
 

1975 births
Living people
First Nations artists
21st-century Canadian artists
Artists from Calgary
Canadian male artists
21st-century Canadian male artists